Sheila Klein is a sculptor and public artist living and working in Bow, Washington and Buenos Aires, Argentina. Her practice straddles the worlds of architecture, sculpture, installation and traditional women's crafts. She is particularly noted for her monumental projects dressing public buildings with hand crocheted and knitted steel. She lives on a farm in the Skagit Valley near Seattle, Washington with her artist husband Ries Niemi, and sons Rebar and Torque. Sheila has created numerous public art projects across the USA (e.g. Vermonica), and maintains a parallel studio practice as a sculptor and installation artist.

In 2013 Klein received a GAP award from the Artist Trust to assist with travel and living for a project in Ahmedabad, India, creating an architectural textile together with Muslim women who are members of the Sarkhej Roza Mosque community. National Institute of Design students will also work with Klein to design products which community women can produce to generate a more stable source of income for the community.

Awards
 2013 Artist Trust | Fellowship Grant | Seattle, Washington
 2013 McColl Center for Visual Art | Residency | Charlotte, North Carolina 
 2012 Artist Trust | Fellowship Grant | Seattle, Washington
 2009 Year in Review | Columnseum | Public Art Network
 2008 Grand Prize for Design | Underground Girl | Metal Architecture.
 2005 Public Art in Review | Comfort Zone | Art in America.
 2004 Public Art in Review | Leopard Sky | Art in America.
 2002 Public Art in Review | Show and Hide | Art in America.
 2001 Award of Merit Lumen West Awards | Illuminating Engineering Society | Los Angeles Section.
 2001 Best Subway Station | New Times, Los Angeles | Carefree Guide to L.A. March 8–14.
 2001 Beautification Award | Highland MetroRail Station, Los Angeles Business Council | Los Angeles, California.
 2000 Public Art in Review | Underground Girl | Art in America.
 2000 Best Installation Outside of New York at an Alternative Institution | Nomination, International Art Critics Association.
 1999 The Westside Prize | Westside Urban Forum, ”Pico Boulevard Streetscape Plan” | Santa Monica, California.
 1993 Ojai Arts Commission | Ojai, California.
 1992 Meritorious Achievement Award | Vermonica | City of Los Angeles | Los Angeles, California.
 1989 Barnsdall Art Park | Board of Overseers | Los Angeles, California.
 1986 40 Under 40 | Interiors Magazine, September Issue.

Works and publications

References

External links
 Another Bouncing Ball:Regina Hackett takes her Art to Go, Sheila Klein/Ries Niemi – domestic discontents, March 17, 2010 by Regina Hackett
 Art Slant/New York, The Recognitions: The Natural Force of Sheila Klein, by Jessica Powers, Posted by Jessica Powers on 3/28/11
 McColl Center for the Arts, Upcoming Residents, SHEILA KLEIN : SCULPTURE, PUBLIC ART

Living people
American women artists
Feminist artists
American contemporary artists
People from Bow, Washington
Year of birth missing (living people)
21st-century American women